Two referendums on United Nations membership applications were held in Taiwan on 22 March 2008, the same day as the presidential elections.

The first referendum question, supported by the Democratic Progressive Party (DPP) of President Chen Shui-bian, asked whether voters agree that the government should seek United Nations membership under the name "Taiwan". The second referendum question, supported by the Kuomintang (KMT), which on the same day won the presidential election, asked whether voters supported "our nation" seeking to "return" to the United Nations and join other international organisations under "flexible and practical strategies", including joining as "Republic of China", "Taiwan", or any other name that aids success and national dignity.

Although large majorities voted in favour of both proposals, the referendums were invalidated as voter turnout was just 36%, well below the 50% required. In contrast, the simultaneous presidential elections had a turnout of 76%.

Questions

Proposal 5
Proposal 5 was initiated by Yu Shyi-kun, former Premier and chairman of the Democratic Progressive Party. The topic was "Application to become a new member of the United Nations under the name “Taiwan”"

Proposal 6
Proposal 6 was first initiated by Vincent Siew, former Premier and Vice President.

Campaign
Although the proposals referendums were both supported by one of the two major parties in Taiwan, they were both formally voter-initiated, rather than government-sponsored. While the KMT initiated one of the two referendums, it encouraged its voters to least boycott the DPP-initiated referendum, and expressed understanding if supporters chose to boycott both referendums. Although KMT officials such as presidential candidate Ma Ying-jeou and chairman Wu Po-hsiung received ballot papers for the KMT-sponsored referendum, their family and other KMT officials, such as chairman emeritus Lien Chan refused to take ballot papers for either referendum. Former president Lee Teng-hui did not take either ballot paper, which he said was because he "forgot" to bring the documentation, although reporters at the scene pointed out to him that he did not need documentation to vote. DPP officials, including president Chen Shui-bian, called on voters to vote in both referendums.

Opinion polls
Referendum on applying for United Nations membership under the name of "Taiwan"

Referendum on flexible participation in international organizations

Results

Reactions
: The United States Department of State has stated that it opposed a referendum on membership in the United Nations.  While it strongly supports Taiwan's democratic development and is not opposed to referendums in principle, it is against "any initiative that appears designed to change Taiwan's status unilaterally." In September 2007, Zogby International conducted an opinion poll on the support of this referendum, the result shows over 61% of Americans believe that the US government should support the referendum.

: A Japanese company also conducted a poll on the same issue; the result shows over 74% Japanese support Taiwan's entry into the UN, and over 81% support the referendum.  However, this referendum has not become a major political issue in either the United States or Japan.

: China made relatively few comments on the issue. It argued that the referendum would "endanger peace and stability across the Strait and the Asia-Pacific region.", and was "pinning hope on the Taiwan people" and will keep promoting cross-Strait exchanges to strengthen opposition to secessionist forces. It had stated that it appreciated the US opposition to the referendum. After the referendums were defeated due to low voter turnout, the Taiwan Affairs Office of the State Council of the People's Republic of China commented that the results showed the lack of popular support for independence in Taiwan. The Bureau also expressed optimism for the two governments to work together to maintain cross-strait peace and aid development in future.

President Chen Shui-bian accused both the United States and the European Union of caving into Chinese pressure over the referendum.

References

External links
official press kit for the Republic of China United Nations membership referendum, 2008
Taiwan’s UN Dilemma: To Be or Not To Be (Brookings Institution)

United Nations membership referendums
2008 referendums
2008 United Nations membership referendums
China and the United Nations
Taiwan and the United Nations